Personal environmental impact accounting  (PEIA) is a computer software-based methodology developed in 1992 by Don Lotter   for quantifying an individual's impact on the environment via analysis of answers to an extensive quantity-based questionnaire that the individual fills out regarding their lifestyle.  The questions are arranged in six areas: home energy and water, transportation, consumerism, waste, advocacy, and demographics.

Conception
Lotter, at the time a graduate student in ecology at the University of California, Davis, developed the PEIA methodology while teaching a course on the History of Western Consciousness in the UC Davis Experimental College.  He realized that, while individuals in contemporary Western society generally have an enormous environmental impact, there is very little awareness of it and no method for its quantification or assessment.

Development
The first software version of the PEIA methodology was the DOS-based EnviroAccount software, written in QuickBasic and completed in 1992. The basic PEIA algorithms were then transferred to Windows 3.1 based EarthAware software, released in 1996.

EarthAware is still available for download and runs on Windows 32-bit computers.

Lotter also authored a book on the topic, EarthScore: Your Personal Environmental Audit and Guide.

See also
PEIA is similar in concept to the Ecological footprint.

Notes and references

Environmental science software
Accounting
Types of accounting